Peden Brown McLeod (September 3, 1940 – December 30, 2021) was an American former politician. He served in the South Carolina House of Representatives and  South Carolina Senate as a Democrat. He was born in Walterboro, South Carolina and is a lawyer there. McLeod graduated from the Asheville Academy in Asheville, North Carolina. He then graduated from Wofford College in 1962. McLeod served in the United States Army from 1962 to 1964 and was commissioned a captain. In 1967, McLeod graduated from the University of South Carolina School of Law. He also served on the  Walterboro City Council from 1970 to 1972. McLeod died at the Colleton Medical Center in Walterboro, South Carolina.

References

1940 births
2021 deaths
People from Walterboro, South Carolina
Military personnel from South Carolina
University of South Carolina School of Law alumni
Wofford College alumni
South Carolina lawyers
Democratic Party members of the South Carolina House of Representatives
Democratic Party South Carolina state senators